2012 FIBA Asia Cup was the 4th FIBA Asia Cup, the basketball tournament of FIBA Asia was held at the Ota City General Gymnasium, in Ota, Tokyo, Japan from September 14–22, 2012. The winner of this year's FIBA Asia Cup automatically qualifies for the FIBA Asia Championship in 2013.

Qualification
According to the FIBA Asia rules, each zone had one place, and the hosts (Japan) and Asian champion (China) were automatically qualified. The other two places are allocated to the zones according to performance in the 2011 FIBA Asia Championship.

Draw
The draw was held on July 1 at Tokyo.

 The draw was conducted before the qualifiers from Southeast Asia, Central Asia and South Asia were known.

Preliminary round

Group A

Group B

Final round

Quarterfinals

Semifinals 5th–8th

Semifinals

7th place

5th place

3rd place

Final

Final standing

Awards

Most Valuable Player:  Samad Nikkhah Bahrami

All-Star Team:

 PG –  Ryota Sakurai
 SG –  Hamed Afagh
 SF –  Samad Nikkhah Bahrami
 PF –  Kosuke Takeuchi
 C –  Asghar Kardoust

References

External links
 Tournament official website

Stankovic Cup
FIBA Asia Cup 2012
B
FIBA Asia Challenge
Sports competitions in Tokyo